Semmy Kessy (born 30 November 1984) is a retired Tanzanian football striker.

References

1984 births
Living people
Tanzanian footballers
Tanzania international footballers
Young Africans S.C. players
African Lyon F.C. players
Lipuli F.C. players
La Passe FC players
Association football forwards
Tanzanian expatriate footballers
Expatriate footballers in Seychelles
Tanzanian expatriate sportspeople in Seychelles
Tanzanian Premier League players